King's Road is a street in Chelsea, London, England.

King's Road or Kings Road may also refer to:
 King's Road (Hong Kong)
 King's Road (Finland)
 King's Road (Florida), part of Florida State Road 4 (pre-1945)
 Kings Road, Adelaide, part of route A17 across the northern suburbs of Adelaide, South Australia
 King's Road style (also known as "Royal Road"), a style of Japanese professional wrestling popularized by All Japan Pro Wrestling
 "Kings Road," a song by Tom Petty and the Heartbreakers from Hard Promises

See also
King's Highway (disambiguation)
Royal Road (disambiguation)
King's Way
Via Regia